Seasonal influenza vaccine brands include Fluzone/Fluzone Quadrivalent and Vaxigrip/VaxigripTetra, Influvac and Optaflu.

AstraZeneca 
Fluenz, FluMist and their quadrivalent formulations are nasal attenuated vaccines by AstraZeneca.
 Fluenz
 Fluenz Tetra
 FluMist
 FluMist Quadrivalent

GlaxoSmithKline
Fluarix, Flulaval and their quadrivalent formulations are split virus inactivated vaccines by GlaxoSmithKline.
 Fluarix
 Flulaval
 Fluarix Tetra

Mylan
Influvac and its quadrivalent formulation are surface antigen subunit vaccines marketed by Mylan.
 Influvac
 Influvac Tetra

They contain inactivated purified surface fragments (subunits) from the three different strains of the influenza virus (A/H1N1, A/H3N2, and Influenza B virus) that are selected and distributed by the World Health Organization, on the basis of their latest recommendations. Previously, they were produced and marketed by Abbott Laboratories

In February 2010, Abbott acquired the vaccines subunit from Solvay Pharmaceuticals included in its $6.2 billion purchase and the subunit influenza vaccine — Influvac has been commercially available on the market since the early nineteen-eighties. With the acquisition of Solvay, Abbott retained access to the Eastern European, Middle Eastern & Latin American markets. Approximately $850 million of sales revenue from vaccines was reported by Solvay Pharmaceuticals in 2009.

In February 2015, Mylan Laboratories completed the deal with Abbott to purchase Abbott's generic drugs business in developed markets, which includes Influvac.

Novartis
Optaflu is a trivalent surface antigen inactivated vaccine prepared in cell cultures manufactured by Novartis.

On April 27, 2007, Novartis received a positive opinion supporting European Union approval of Optaflu. It is the first influenza vaccine made in a mammalian cell line, rather than chicken eggs. The plan was to manufacture the vaccine in Holly Springs, North Carolina. The United States government provided $500 million in construction costs and guaranteed vaccine purchases.

Novartis' flu vaccine unit was sold to CSL Limited in 2014, and was placed under CSL subsidiary, bioCSL (Seqirus).
bioCSL as marketing authorization holder decided to discontinue the usage of Optaflu brand in 2017 due to commercial reasons

Sanofi-Aventis 
Vaxigrip Tetra and Fluquadri are quadrivalent split virus inactivated vaccines by Sanofi-Aventis.
 Vaxigrip Tetra
 Fluquadri

Sanofi Pasteur
Sanofi Pasteur produces the following vaccines:
 Fluzone
 Vaxigrip/Vaxigrip Tetra
 Flublok

Fluzone

Fluzone and its quadrivalent formulation are split virus inactivated vaccines distributed by Sanofi Pasteur mainly in the United States.

Dosage and storage
Fluzone is typically administered in a single dose by intramuscular injection; an intradermal injection is also available. It is presented as a 0.25 ml syringe for pediatric use, as a 0.5 ml syringe for adults and children, as a 0.5 ml vial for adults and children, and as a 5 ml vial for adults and children. Fluzone was initially approved in 1980 by the FDA.

Adverse effects
The following adverse effects have been reported:
 Mild soreness, local pain and swelling at the local of the injection
 In small children and in people with no previous exposure to a flu vaccine, episodes of fever, malaise, myalgia (muscle pain)
 In people who are sensitive to egg protein, allergic reactions may ensue, such as hives, angioedema, asthma and anaphylaxis

High-dose vaccine
A high-dose vaccine (Fluzone High-Dose) four times the strength of standard flu vaccine was approved by the FDA in 2009. This vaccine is intended for people 65 and over, who typically have weakened immune response due to normal aging. The vaccine produces a greater immune response than standard vaccine.  According to the CDC, "a study published in the New England Journal of Medicine [in August, 2014] indicated that the high-dose vaccine was 24.2% more effective in preventing flu in adults 65 years of age and older relative to a standard-dose vaccine."  The CDC recommends the high-dose vaccine for people 65 and over but expresses no preference between it and standard vaccine.  Further studies were underway .

Vaxigrip/Vaxigrip Tetra
Vaxigrip and its quadrivalent formulation Vaxigrip Tetra are split virus inactivated vaccines made by Sanofi Pasteur in Europe. Vaxigrip provides immune responses to three influenza strains and VaxigripTetra adds another B strain. VaxigripTetra was approved in Europe in 2016 except for infants younger than three years old.

Flublok/Flublok Quadrivalent
Flublok and its quadrivalent formulation are recombinant subunit vaccines prepared in cell cultures. Recombinant influenza vaccines are produced using recombinant virus technology. This method does not require an egg-grown vaccine virus and does not use chicken eggs in the production process. The DNA for the hemagglutinin antigen of influenza virus is added to a baculovirus. This recombinant virus is then used to infect cultured insect cells (of the moth Spodoptera frugiperda), which subsequently produce the hemagglutinin protein. The protein is harvested and purified. This is done for four different types of influenza hemagglutinin to create the Flublok Quadrivalent vaccine.

Seqirus
Afluria and its quadrivalent formulation are a split virus inactivated vaccines. Fluad and its quadrivalent formulations are adjuvanted surface antigen inactivated vaccines. Flucelvax and its quadrivalent formulations are surface antigen inactivated vaccines prepared in cell cultures.

Novartis developed the first influenza vaccine, which did not need to be grown in chicken eggs, a cell-based vaccine.
In 2014, CSL Limited obtained Novartis' flu vaccine unit, and transferred it to CSL Subsidiary, bioCSL, named Seqirus.

The following are list of bioCSL flu vaccine brands:
 Trivalent
 Afluria, also marketed as Enzira, Fluvax, and Nilgrip in various different markets
 Agrippal, also marketed as Begripal, Fluazur, Sandovac, Agriflu, and Chiroflu in various different markets
 Fluad, also marketed as Chiromas in Spain
 Fluad Pediatric, a pediatric vaccine
 Quadrivalent
 Afluria Quadrivalent, also marketed as Afluria Quad and Afluria Tetra in various different markets
 Fluad Quad
 Fluad Quadrivalent
 Fluad Tetra
 Flucelvax Quad
 Flucelvax Quadrivalent
 Flucelvax Tetra

See also 
 Pandemrix, a pandemic flu vaccine
 H5N1 vaccine

References

External links
 
 
 
 
 
 
 
 

AstraZeneca brands
GSK plc brands
Influenza vaccines
Novartis brands
Subunit vaccines